Naomi Foyle (born 22 February 1967) is a British-Canadian poet, novelist, essayist, editor, translator and activist. Best known for her five science fiction novels (Seoul Survivors, Astra, Rook Song, The Blood of the Hoopoe and Stained Light), and her three poetry collections (The Night Pavilion, The World Cup and Adamantine), she is also the author of several poetry pamphlets, two verse dramas and various short stories and essays. A non-Muslim Fellow of the Muslim Institute, Foyle is a contributing editor to Critical Muslim. For her poetry and essays about Ukraine, she was awarded the 2014 Hryhorii Skovoroda Prize.

Life and career

Foyle was born in London, UK. She was brought up in London, Hong Kong, Liverpool and Saskatchewan, and graduated from the University of Toronto with a BA in Philosophy in 1990.

In Toronto, Foyle wrote the lyrics to a song cycle based on the story of the Pied Piper of Hamelin. Set to music, the project grew to become Hush: An Opera in Two Bestial Acts, for which Foyle wrote the libretto. Featuring jazz singers Taborah Johnson and Holly Cole, Hush was produced at Theatre Passe Muraille in the autumn of 1990, and won three Dora Mavor Moore Awards, including Best Musical. The same year Foyle wrote the liner notes for Holly Cole's first album, Girl Talk.

In 1991 Foyle returned to the United Kingdom, settling in Brighton, East Sussex, where she worked at radical book shop the Public House Book Shop and published poetry in magazines. Following the death of her mother, British-Canadian writer Brenda Macdonald Riches, she lived in Vancouver from 1994 to 1996, working as the Office Manager and Librarian at the Kootenay School of Writing, and publishing the so-called "L*A*N*G*U*A*G*E poetry" pamphlet Febrifugue (treeplantsink press, 1996). From 1996 to 1997 she travelled in Central America, lived briefly in Saskatchewan and Brighton in 1996–7, recorded songs with various Canadian musicians, and self-published other poetry pamphlets. Between 1997 and 1999 Foyle taught English as a foreign language in Seoul, South Korea, the setting for her first novel, Seoul Survivors. In 1999 her short story "Star Pitch" appeared in the Serpent's Tail anthology Suspect Device, edited by Stewart Home.

Foyle returned to Brighton in 2000, where she read tarot cards for a living and continued to publish poetry pamphlets, including Red Hot & Bothered (Lansdowne Press, 2003), edited by poet and folk artist Graham Ackroyd and Canada (Echo Room Press, 2004), edited by Brendan Cleary. A visitor to Belfast since the mid-nineties, following the death of poet and journalist Mairtín Crawford in 2004, she edited and introduced the posthumous Mairtín Crawford: Selected Poems (Lagan Press, 2005).

In 2008 Foyle began a relationship with Waterloo Press (Hove), who published her first two poetry collections (The Night Pavilion (2008) and The World Cup (2010)), and two subsequent pamphlets (Grace of the Gamblers: A Chantilly Chantey, illustrated by Peter Griffiths, and No Enemy but Time (2017). Foyle began working as an editor. She has edited twenty collections of poetry including The Privilege of Rain by David Swann (Waterloo Press, 2010), shortlisted for the 2011 Ted Hughes Award for New Work in Poetry, Tantie Diablesse by Fawzia Muradali Kane, shortlisted for the OCM Bocas Prize for Caribbean Literature and Blue Wallpaper by Robert Hamberger, shortlisted for the 2020 Polari Prize. With Akila Richards, she is the co-project manager of LIT UP, an Arts Council England-funded mentoring and publishing programme for emerging poets of colour.

During her doctoral studies (2006-2011), Foyle became involved in the struggle for a just peace in Israel and Palestine. With poet Judith Kazantzis and novelist Irving Weinman, she co-founded British Writers in Support of Palestine (BWISP), an organisation that, prior to being subsumed by Artists for Palestine UK (APUK) campaigned for the cultural and academic boycott of Israel. In 2011, The Strange Wife, her one act verse drama set in Jerusalem, was produced at the Bush Theatre as part of the Sixty-Six Books project. In 2017 she edited the bilingual anthology A Blade of Grass: New Palestinian Poetry (Smokestack Books).

From 2013 to 2018 Foyle published five science fiction novels with Jo Fletcher Books (Quercus UK/USA): the standalone cyberchiller Seoul Survivors, named by the Guardian as "among the best in recent SF", and the eco-science fantasy quartet The Gaia Chronicles, comprising Astra, Rook Song, The Blood of the Hoopoe and Stained Light. On the basis of Astra, Library Journal recommended the series "for Hunger Games fans of all ages". During this period Foyle appeared at science fiction conventions in the UK and Canada and published guest blogs, and an essay in Critical Muslim on the process of writing diverse eco-feminist science fiction.

In 2016, Foyle was diagnosed with breast cancer. Her essay "Cancer: Key to Utopia" appeared in Critical Muslim in 2017. Poems about her diagnosis, treatment and recovery are included in her third poetry collection, Adamantine, which was published by Red Hen/Pighog Press (Pasadena) and launched in America, Canada and the UK in 2019.

Foyle has participated in international literary festivals and events, and holds a PhD in Creative Writing from Bangor University (2011) and is a Senior Lecturer in Creative Writing at the University of Chichester. Her editorial positions also include Creative Writing Editor of Gramarye, the journal of the Chichester Centre for Fairy Tales, Fantasy and Speculative Fiction.

In 2021, Foyle disclosed on her blog that she had been diagnosed with autism the previous year at the age of 53.

Selected publications

Prose 

 Seoul Survivors Jo Fletcher Books, 2013, 
 Astra: Book One of the Gaia Chronicles Jo Fletcher Books, 2014. 
 Rook Song: Book Two of the Gaia Chronicles Jo Fletcher Books, 2015. 
 The Blood of the Hoopoe: Book Three of the Gaia Chronicles Jo Fletcher Books, 2016. 
 Stained Light: Book Four of the Gaia Chronicles Jo Fletcher Books, 2018.

Poetry collections 

 The Night Pavilion Waterloo Press, 2008. 
 The World Cup Waterloo Press, 2010. 
 Adamantine Red Hen/Pighog Press, 2019.

Poetry pamphlets 

 Curdled Cream: A Collection of Snarls. Kinkos, Toronto. 1990.
 Febrifuge treeplantsink press, 1996
 Citas Impossibles/Impossible Engagements, 1997
 Forgive the Rain: more exceptionally useless poems Back Pack Press, 1997 [2nd Ed. 1999]
 Songs from the Blood Shed Window Grate Press, 1996 [2nd ed 2000]
 Aphrodite’s Answering Machine: Erotic Vignettes Urban Pillow, 2002
 Red Hot & Bothered Lansdowne Press, 2003
 Canada Echo Room Press, 2004
 Grace of the Gamblers: A Chantilly Chantey Waterloo Press, 2010 
 No Enemy but Time Waterloo Press, 2017

Edited anthologies & collections (with introductions) 

 Mairtin Crawford: Selected Poems. Lagan Press, 2005
 A Blade of Grass: New Palestinian Poetry (Smokestack Books, 2017)

Co-translations 

 Enemies Outside / Enemigos Afuera by Mori Ponsowy. Translated by Mori Ponsowy and Naomi Foyle. 
 Wounds of the Cloud by Yasser Khanger. Al Ma’mal Foundation, 2016. Translated by Naomi Foyle, Marilyn Hacker and Do’a Ali.

References

External links 

 Naomi Foyle's website
 Poem of the week: Winterpause by Naomi Foyle
 Poem of the week: Your Summer Arm
 A Flight over the Black Sea (London, Waterloo Press), (Політ над Чорним морем), 2014 (poems by Ihor Pavlyuk in English. Translated from Ukrainian by Stephen Komarnyckyj, foreword to a book written recipient of the Nobel Prize for Literature Mo Yan and Naomi Foyle, Steve Komarnyckyj, Dmytro Drozdovskyi), 

Living people
British women journalists
British women novelists
1967 births
20th-century British poets
21st-century British poets
Writers from London
People on the autism spectrum